The knockout stage of the 2004–05 UEFA Cup began on 16 February 2005, and concluded with the final at the Estádio José Alvalade in Lisbon on 18 May 2005. The final phase involved the 24 teams that finished in the top three in each group in the group stage and the eight teams that finished in third place in the UEFA Champions League group stage.

Each tie in the final phase, apart from the final, was played over two legs, with each team playing one leg at home. The team that had the higher aggregate score over the two legs progressed to the next round. In the event that aggregate scores finished level, the team that scored more goals away from home over the two legs progressed. If away goals are also equal, 30 minutes of extra time were played. If goals were scored during extra time and the aggregate score was still level, the visiting team qualified by virtue of more away goals scored. If no goals were scored during extra time, there would be a penalty shoot-out after extra time.

In the final, the tie was played over just one leg at a neutral venue. If scores were level at the end of normal time in the final, extra time was played, followed by penalties if scores had remained tied.

Bracket

Round of 32

|}

First leg

Second leg

Partizan won 3–2 on aggregate.

Shakhtar Donetsk won 2–1 on aggregate.

AZ won 2–1 on aggregate.

2–2 on aggregate; Steaua București won 4–3 on penalties.

Olympiacos won 2–0 on aggregate.

Parma won 2–0 on aggregate.

Middlesbrough won 4–3 on aggregate.

Newcastle United won 4–2 on aggregate.

Sporting CP won 4–2 on aggregate.

Auxerre won 3–2 on aggregate.

Real Zaragoza won 3–1 on aggregate.

Lille won 2–0 on aggregate.

CSKA Moscow won 3–1 on aggregate.

Sevilla won 2–1 on aggregate.

Villarreal won 2–0 on aggregate.

Austrie Wien won 2–1 on aggregate.

Round of 16

|}

First leg

Second leg

CSKA Moscow won 3–1 on aggregate.

Newcastle United won 7–1 on aggregate.

AZ won 5–2 on aggregate.

3–3 on aggregate; Austria Wien won on away goals.

Auxerre won 1–0 on aggregate.

Sporting CP won 4–2 on aggregate.

Parma won 1–0 on aggregate.

Villareal won 2–0 on aggregate.

Quarter–finals

|}

First leg

Second leg

Sporting CP won 4–2 on aggregate.

AZ won 3–2 on aggregate.

1–1 on aggregate; Parma won on away goals.

CSKA Moscow won 4–2 on aggregate.

Semi–finals

|}

First leg

Second leg

4–4 on aggregate; Sporting CP won on away goals.

CSKA Moscow won 3–0 on aggregate.

Final

References

External links
2004–05 All matches UEFA Cup – season at UEFA website
Official Site

2004–05 UEFA Cup
UEFA Cup knockout phases